Kendalia may refer to:
Kendalia, Texas, a community in Kendall County, Texas
Kendalia, West Virginia, a community in Kanawha County, West Virginia